Allies and Morrison LLP is an architecture and urban planning practice based in London and Cambridge. Founded in 1984, the practice is now one of Britain's largest architectural firms. The practice's work ranges from architecture and interior design to conservation and renovation of historic buildings to urbanism, planning, consultation and research. The firm's notable projects include the redevelopment of the Royal Festival Hall, the masterplan for the Queen Elizabeth Olympic Park, BBC Media Village and the redevelopment of King's Cross Central. The practice has a reputation for designing modernist, yet stylistically restrained buildings.

They have completed projects throughout the UK, and in Ireland, India, Africa and the Middle East and in North America. The practice's portfolio includes cultural, educational, public and housing projects.

Work
Buildings designed by Allies and Morrison include:
Abbey Mills Pumping Station
BBC Media Village, White City, London
Brighton College Simon Smith Building 
Charles Street Car Park, Sheffield
Chelsea College of Arts
New home for London College of Fashion, Stratford
New campus for London College of Communication, Elephant and Castle
Fitzwilliam College, Cambridge University
Ash Court, Library and Archive at Girton College, Cambridge University
Highbury Square, redevelopment of Arsenal Stadium
Horniman Museum extension
London King's Cross railway station-St Pancras railway station Link
Maurice Wohl Clinical Neuroscience Institute, King's College London
Merton College, Oxford University
University of Cambridge Sidgwick Site new buildings: Faculty of English and Cambridge Institute of Criminology
Rambert Dance Company, South Bank, London
Restoration of Queen's House, Greenwich
Royal Albert Memorial Museum, Exeter
Royal Festival Hall refurbishment
Renovation and extension of Royal Observatory, Greenwich
Sam Wanamaker Playhouse at Shakespeare's Globe
South Yorkshire Police headquarters, Sheffield
Two Fifty One mixed-use development, Elephant and Castle, London

Allies and Morrison masterplans include:
King's Cross Central
Madinat al Irfan, urban extension to Muscat
Msheireb Downtown Doha
Queen Elizabeth Olympic Park games and legacy masterplans (with EDAW)
Stratford Waterfront, Queen Elizabeth Olympic Park Cultural and Education District
Wood Wharf, extension to Canary Wharf

The practice has won 41 RIBA Awards, 18 Civic Trust Awards and the 2015 AJ120 Practice of the Year award.

References

External links

Architecture firms based in London
Conservation architects
Design companies established in 1984
1984 establishments in England